Jewish immigration to Latin America began with seven sailors arriving in Christopher Columbus' crew. The Jewish population of Latin America is today (2018) less than 300,000 — more than half of whom live in Argentina, with large communities also present in Brazil, Chile, Mexico, Uruguay and Venezuela.

To be included in this list, the person must have a Wikipedia article showing they are Jewish from the indicated country of origin or must have references showing they are Jewish from the indicated country of origin and are notable.
 

The following is a list of some prominent Latin American Jews, arranged by country of origin:

Argentina

 Ernesto Acher, Taringa musician-humorist, former member of the group Les Luthiers
 Marcos Aguinis, journalist/writer
 José Alperovich, governor of the Tucumán Province
 Héctor Babenco, film director (Argentinian-born)
 Daniel Barenboim, conductor and pianist
 Tania Bíder revolutionary fighter
 Marcelo Birmajer, writer
 Laszlo Biro, inventor of the ballpoint pen
 Jácobo Bolbochán, chess player
 Julio Bolbochán, chess player
 Mauricio Borensztein (better known as Tato Bores), comedian
Daniel Burman (1973–) filmmaker
 Israel Adrián Caetano, film director
 Andres Cantor, sports commentator
 Sergio Chejfec, writer
 Mario Davidovsky, composer
 Alicia Dujovne Ortiz, writer
 Giora Feidman, klezmer musician 
 Movsas Feigins, chess player
 Daniel Filmus, ex-Argentine Education Minister
 Paulino Frydman, chess player
 Juan Gelman, poet
 Alberto Gerchunoff, writer
 Max Glücksmann, pioneer of Argentine music and film industries
 Osvaldo Golijov, classical composer
 Guillermo Israilevich, soccer player of Israeli National Team (Jewish father)
 Martín Jaite, former tennis player
 Guido Kaczka, actor, show host
 Mauricio Kagel, classical composer
 Daniel Katz, mayor of Mar del Plata
 León Klimovsky, film director
 Miguel Lifschitz, mayor of Rosario (Jewish father)
 César Milstein, immunologist, Nobel prize
 Marcos Mundstock, musician-humorist of the group Les Luthiers
 Miguel Najdorf, chess player
 Gastón Needleman, chess player
 Carlos Núñez Cortés, musician-humorist of the group Les Luthiers
 Alicia Partnoy, writer
 Raquel Partnoy, painter
 José Pékerman, soccer manager
 Jiří Pelikán, chess player
 Melina Petriella, actress
 Alejandra Pizarnik, poet
 Isaías Pleci, chess player
 Julio Popper, engineer and colonizer of Tierra del Fuego, from Romania
 Ariel Rot, musician
 Cecilia Roth, actress
 Lalo Schifrin, composer
 Aaron Schwartzman, chess player
 Diego Schwartzman, tennis player
 Samuel Schweber, chess player
 Ana María Shua, writer
 Ariel Sorín, chess player
 Juan Pablo Sorín, soccer player
 Coti Sorokin, songwriter/musician/composer
 Ana Maria Stekelman, Tango choreographer
 Oscar Strasnoy, classical composer
 Jorge Telerman, ex-mayor of Buenos Aires
 Jacobo Timmerman, journalist
 Bernardo Verbitsky, novelist
Eva Verbitsky Hunt, archaeologist
 Horacio Verbitsky, journalist
 Bernardo Wexler, chess player

Bolivia
 Lene Schneider-Kainer, painter
 Paul Baender, chess player
 Ricardo Udler, Bolivia's Jewish community leader

Brazil
 Davi Alcolumbre, senator and president of the Brazilian Senate
 Clara Ant, political activist and presidential adviser
 Jom Tob Azulay, film director
 Héctor Babenco, film director
 Eduardo Saverin, co-founder and CFO of Facebook.
 Leoncio Basbaum, physician and political activist
 Moysés Baumstein, holographer, film/video producer, painter, writer
 Adriana Behar, beach volleyball player
 Samuel Benchimol, entrepreneur and Amazon pioneer
 Abraham Bentes, army commander
 Daniel Benzali, TV actor
 Marcelo Samuel Berman, physicist and writer
 Joel Birman, writer
 Eva Altman Blay, sociologist and politician
 Debora Bloch, actress
 Jonas Bloch, actor
 Bussunda (Claudio Besserman Vianna), comedian
 Waldemar Levy Cardoso, field marshal
 Boris Casoy, journalist
 Otto Maria Carpeaux, literary critic
 Moyses Chahon, army commander
 Juca Chaves (Jurandyr Czaczkes), comedian, composer and singer
 Victor Civita, journalist
 Arnaldo Cohen, pianist
 Gilberto Dimenstein, journalist
 Alberto Dines, journalist
 Dina Dublon, director
 German Efromovich, entrepreneur
Benny Feilhaber professional soccer player
 Fortuna, singer and composer
 Vilém Flusser, philosopher
 Marcelo Gleiser, physicist and writer
 José Goldemberg, educator, physicist and minister
 Neiman Gracie, martial artist, member of the Gracie family
 Fernando Grostein Andrade, cinematographer
 Mario Haberfeld, racing driver
 Alexandre Herchcovitch, fashion designer
 Wladimir Herzog, journalist
 Luciano Huck, TV show host
 Roberto Justus, advertiser and TV host onde, quando/quem_onde_quando_nov_2004.htm
 Isaac Karabtchevsky, musician and conductor
 Jacques Klein, pianist 
 Samuel Klein (businessman), entrepreneur 
 Samuel Kicis, army commander
 Ithamara Koorax, jazz singer
 Miguel Krigsner, entrepreneur and environmentalist
 Celso Lafer, diplomat 
 Cesar Lattes, physicist
 Jaime Lerner, politician (governor Paraná state), urban planner
 Alexandre Levy, musician
 José Lewgoy, actor and director
 Clarice Lispector, writer
 Gerson Levi-Lazzaris, ethnoarchaeologist
 Carlos Maltz, drummer of rock band Engenheiros do Hawaii
 Luísa Mell (Marina Zatz de Camargo Zaborowsky), presenter and animal activist
 Leopoldo Nachbin, mathematician
 Noel Nutels, public health physician and human rights activist
 Carlos Nuzman, sportsman and president of Olympic Committee 
 Ivo Perelman, jazz saxophonist 
 Olga Benário Prestes, German-born communist militant
 Paulo Ribenboim, mathematician
 Sultana Levy Rosenblatt, writer
 Edmond Safra, banker 
 Jacob Safra, banker
 Joseph Safra, banker
 Moise Safra, banker
 Silvio Santos (Senor Abravanel), TV show host
 Mario Schenberg, physicist
 Moacyr Scliar, writer
 Lasar Segall, artist
 Ricardo Semler, entrepreneur
 Alfredo Sirkis, politician and environmentalist
 Amir Slama, fashion designer
 Henry Sobel, rabbi, community leader
 Márcio Stambowsky, martial artist, father of Neiman Gracie
 Didi Wagner (Adriana Golombek Wagner), presenter
 Mauricio Waldman, sociologist and politician
 Yara Yavelberg, political activist
 Mayana Zatz, geneticist
 Benjamin Zymler, auditor-general

Chile

 Baruch Arensburg, physical anthropologist
 Claudio Bunster, theoretical physicist
 Leo Corry, mathematician
 Julián Elfenbein, journalist, television host
 Daniel Emilfork, actor
 Leonardo Farkas, businessman
 Robert Frucht, mathematician
 Rodrigo Hinzpeter, (2010–2012) Minister of Interior and Public Security
 Tomás Hirsch, politician, businessman
 Alejandro Jodorowsky, film director
 Mario Luis Kreutzberger Blumenfeld, television host
 Ariel Levy, actor
 Nicolás Massú, tennis player
 Sergio Melnick (1987–1989) Minister of Planning
 Israel Polack, businessman
 Karen Poniachik, (2006–2008) Minister of Mining and Energy
 Sebastián Rozental, football player
 Leon Schidlowsky, composer and painter
 Claudio Spies, composer
 Miguel Schweitzer Walters (1983–1983) Minister of Foreign Affairs
 Shmuel Szteinhendler, rabbi & Regional Director Masorti Olami Latin America
 Volodia Teitelboim, lawyer, politician and author
 Alberto van Klaveren, (2006–2009) Minister of Foreign Relations

Colombia
Main: Colombian Jews

 Jorge Isaacs, poet, novelist
 Jaime Gilinski Bacal, banker, real estate developer, philanthropist
 Isaac Gilinski Sragowicz, banker, ambassador
 Andy Lassner, Colombian-American television producer
 Yaneth Waldman, actress, television presenter
 James Martin Eder, industrialist, entrepreneur, pioneer
 Fortunato De Lerma agriculturist
 Evaristo Sourdis Juliao, lawyer, diplomat, politic
 Ramon Gomez Portillo, journalist, writer, poet
 Cathy Bekerman, journalist, television presenter
 Olga Behar Leiser, writer, political science, journalist
 Saúl Balagura, artist, poet
 Sandra Bessudo, marine biologist
 Paul Bromberg, physicist, politician
 Simón Brand, film director
 Eliana Rubashkyn, pharmacist, chemist
 John Sudarsky, senator
 Diana Golden, actress, playwright
 Isaac Lee, journalist, entrepreneur, television producer
 Ernesto Cortissoz, aircraft pilot
 José Tafur-Vina, artist, photographer, painter, contemporary dancer

Cuba

 Ruth Behar, writer
Israel Kantor, singer
 José Antonio Bowen, jazz musician and president of Goucher College
 Fabio Grobart, Communist Party co-founder
 José Miller, leader of the Cuban Jewish community
 Meyer Rosenbaum, rabbi and spiritual leader
 William Levy, actor

Dominican Republic
 Oscar Haza, journalist
 Dominican President Francisco Henríquez y Carvajal
 His son Pedro Henríquez Ureña

Ecuador
 Salomon Isacovici, businessman and writer

El Salvador
 Juan Lindo, president (1841) (Jewish father)
 Ernesto Muyshondt, San Salvador's mayor

Guatemala
 Isaac Farchi, businessman and Politician
 Alcina Lubitch Domecq, author
 David Unger, author
 Eduardo Halfon, author
 Gert Rosenthal, diplomat
 Francisco Goldman, author (Jewish father)

Honduras

 Juan Lindo, president (1847) (Jewish father)
 Salvador Moncada, pharmacologist (Jewish mother)
 Jaime Rosenthal, Honduran businessman and politician (Jewish father)

Mexico

Nicaragua

 Herty Lewites, Nicaraguan politician

Panama
 Eric Arturo Delvalle, president (1987)
 Ricardo Maduro, Honduran president (Panamanian-born)

Paraguay
 Alfredo Seiferheld, writer
 Carlos Schvartzman, musician

Peru

 Eliane Karp, former First Lady of Peru
 Pedro Pablo Kuczynski, former President of Peru
 Salomón Libman, football (soccer) player
 David Waisman Rjavinsthi, former Second Vice President of Peru. Member of the congress for Alianza Parlamentaria party.
 Yehude Simon, former Prime Minister of Peru

Puerto Rico

Alegría Hudes, Quiara, author, playwright. Wrote the book for Broadway's musical In the Heights. Her play, Elliot, a Soldier's Fugue, was a Pulitzer Prize finalist in 2007.
Sandy Alomar Sr., father was Jewish but an agnostic who allowed his children to be brought up Catholic
Anderson, Axel, actor/director, Anderson made his debut in Puerto Rican television with a sitcom named Qué Pareja a local version of I Love Lucy
Blaine, David, magician, Blaine is also an endurance artist and Guinness Book of Records world record-holder
Brugman, Mathias, leader in Puerto Rico's independence revolution against Spain known as El Grito de Lares (Lares' Cry)
Kaplan, Julio, Puerto Rican chess player and former world junior champion
Katz Montiel, Marco, composer for Zoey's Zoo and trombonist with Charlie Palmieri and Mon Rivera
Leavitt, Raphy, composer, director and founder of "La Selecta"
Lehman, Manny, DJ and producer
Meyers, Ari, actress, best known for her role as Emma Jane McArdle in the Kate & Allie (1984) TV series.
Ostow, Micol, author of "Emily Goldberg Learns to Salsa" and "Mind Your Manners, Dick and Jane".
Taff, Layla, Painter, Artist, drawer, daughter of Joseph Tafur-Vina.
Phoenix, Joaquin, actor, was nominated for the Academy Award for Best Supporting Actor, Gladiator in 2000 and in 2005, he was nominated for the Best Actor Oscar, and won a Golden Globe in the same category in 2006 for his role as Johnny Cash in Walk the Line
Rivera, Geraldo, journalist
Sally Jessy Raphael, syndicated talk show host
Seijo, Jorge, Puerto Rican radio and television personality
Starr, Brenda K., salsa singer, her seventh album, Atrevete a Olvidarme, titled, "Tu Eres" earned her a nomination by the Billboard Latin Music Awards in 2006
Snyder, Aaron Cecil, Chief Justice of the Supreme Court of Puerto Rico
Tassler, Nina, President of CBS Entertainment.
Ticotin, Rachel, actress, starred in Critical Condition, Where the Day Takes You Falling Down Total Recall and in Con Air, where she earned an ALMA Award for her role as prison guard Sally Bishop
Ticotin, Sahaj, vocalist/guitarist from the rock band Ra

Uruguay

 Monsieur Chouchani, mysterious scholar
 Gisele Ben-Dor, conductor
 Jorge Drexler, singer/songwriter (Jewish father)
 Ricardo Ehrlich, mayor of Montevideo
 Gabe Saporta, singer/songwriter/bassist of Cobra Starship and Midtown
 Carlos Sherman, writer (Jewish father, Uruguay-born)
 Freddy Nieuchowicz, aka Orlando Petinatti, radio host

Venezuela

Main: Venezuelan Jews

 Harry Abend, sculptor
 Lolita Aniyar de Castro, lawyer and politician
 Ivonne Attas, actress and politician
 Huáscar Barradas, flutist, composer 
 Baruj Benacerraf, immunologist, Nobel Prize in Medicine,1980
 Margot Benacerraf, film director
 Sara Bendahan, Venezuelan physician who was the first Venezuelan woman to complete her medical degree in Venezuela
 Amador Bendayán, actor, comedian
 Alegría Bendayán de Bendelac, writer, professor and poet
Jose Beracasa Anram, entreprenour, sportman
 Manuel Blum, computer scientist,
 Jacques Braunstein, economist, publicist, disc jockey
 Carlos Brandt, writer, philosopher
 Pynchas Brener, Ashkenazi Chief Rabbi of Caracas
Jacobo Brender, writer
 Vytas Brenner, composer, musician
 Gerardo Budowski, chess master
 Miguel Ángel Capriles Ayala, journalist
 Ilan Chester, composer, pop singer
 Isaac Chocron, writer
 Salomon Cohen Levy, engineer
 Leo Corry, mathematician
 Elias David Curiel, poet
 Susana Duijm, Miss World 1955, model, actress
 Daniel Elbittar, actor, model and entertainer
Sammy Eppel, internationalist
 Paulina Gamus, politician
 Gego, sculptor 
 Alicia Freilich, writer, novelist, journalist
 Reynaldo Hahn, composer (Jewish father)
 Joanna Hausmann, comediant YouTuber
 Michel Hausmann, theater director and producer
 Ricardo Hausmann, politician, professor, academic
 Lya Imber (Odessa, Russia, 1914-Caracas, 1981), the first woman in Venezuela to obtain the degree of Doctor of Medicine (Paediatrics & Child Care Specialist) and the first female member of the board of the Medical School of the Federal District.
 Sofía Ímber, journalist
 Jonathan Jakubowicz, film director, writer, and producer
 Karina, pop singer
 Moisés Kaufman, screenwriter, director
 Betty Kaplan, film director
Geula Kohen Moradov, painter
 Ruth de Krivoy, former president of the Central Bank of Venezuela
 Andres Levin, musician
 Ivan Lansberg, lawyer
 Julio Lobo, sugar trader and financier
 Yucef Merhi, artist, poet
 Moisés Naím, journalist, economist
 Elias Mocatta, banker, financer
 Isaac J Pardo, writer, poet
 Jacobo Penzo, film director 
 Teodoro Petkoff, guerrilla fighter and politician, journalist, economist
 L. Rafael Reif, engineer, president of Massachusetts Institute of Technology
 Flor Roffé de Estévez, composer and writer
 Ángel Rosenblat, philologist
 Maurice Ruah, tennis player
 Eduardo Schlageter, painter
 Veronica Schneider, actress
 David Smolansky, politician, Voluntad Popular, mayor of El Hatillo, Miranda State.
 Henrique Salas Römer, politician, former Carabobo State governor
 Leon Schorr, master chess player
Ariel Segal, writer and scholar, correspondent of BBC in Israel
Isaac Senior, trader founder of Casa Senior of Coro
 Rosalinda Serfaty, actress
 Shirley Varnagy, journalist, Globovisión TV host 
Abdul Vas, contemporary artist
  Ernesto Villegas Poljak, journalist, politician
 Vladimir Villegas Poljak, journalist, politician 
 Geula Zylberman, abstract painter

See also
History of the Jews in Mexico
History of the Jews in Latin America
Jewish immigration to Puerto Rico
List of Jews

References

Lists of Jews
Jews
Jews
Jews,Latin American